Löwensenf GmbH is a German mustard company founded in Metz (Alsace-Lorraine) in 1903, currently a subsidiary of Develey Senf & Feinkost GmbH (de). After the World War I the company relocated to Düsseldorf where it operates today. The company produces various types of mustard, including specialties like beer and fig mustard. The company operates a factory today near Düsseldorf Airport, as well as the Mustard Museum in Cologne.

History 

On November 1, 1903, Otto Frenzel founded the Erste Lothringische Essig- und Senffabrik (First Lorraine Vinegar and Mustard Factory) in Metz, then a part of the German Empire. In 1920 after the First World war and the return of Metz and Alsace-Lorraine as a whole to France, the company was moved to Düsseldorf and renamed Neue Düsseldorfer Senfindustrie (New Düsseldorf Mustard Company). Also in 1920, the most well known product, Löwensenf Extra, a sharp Dijon-style mustard was introduced. After the death of Otto Frenzel in 1936, his widow, Frieda Frenzel took over management of the company. In 1948, production was started again after disruptions caused by the Second World War. In the mid-1960s, Löwensenf acquired two other Düsseldorf mustard manufacturers, ABB and Radschläger.

In 2001, Düsseldorfer Löwensenf GmbH began a merger process with the Munich based Develey Senf & Feinkost GmbH, with each company acquiring shares of the other. Distribution was taken over completely by Develey, and by the end of 2001, Löwensenf had become a subsidiary of Develey and continues to make mustard in Düsseldorf-Lichtenbroich.

On February 17, 2014, the word Düsseldorf  was removed from the company name, now shortened to simply Löwensenf GmbH.

See also
 List of mustard brands

External links
 
Düsseldorfer Löwensenf: 100 scharfe Jahre

References 

Mustard (condiment)
Manufacturing companies based in Düsseldorf
Condiment companies
Low